Leiden University Libraries is a library founded in 1575 in Leiden, Netherlands. It is regarded as a significant place in the development of European culture: it is a part of a small number of cultural centres that gave direction to the development and spread of knowledge during the Enlightenment. This was due particularly to the simultaneous presence of a unique collection of exceptional sources and scholars. Holdings include approximately 5,200,000 volumes, 1,000,000 e-books, 70,000 e-journals, 2,000 current paper journals, 60,000 Oriental and Western manuscripts, 500,000 letters, 100,000 maps, 100,000 prints, 12,000 drawings and 300,000 photographs. The library manages the largest collections worldwide on Indonesia and the Caribbean. Furthermore, Leiden University Libraries is the only heritage organization in The Netherlands with three registrations of documents in UNESCO's Memory of the World Register.

"Est hic magna commoditas bibliothecae ut studiosi possint studere"
—Josephus Justus Scaliger

"The greatest advantage of the library is that those who want to study, can study."

History

The 16th-century Dutch Revolt against the Habsburgs created a new country with a new religion. Soon, the need for a seat of higher learning was felt and in 1575 Leiden University was founded with the spoils from a confiscated Catholic monastery nearby.

At the time the university was founded, it was immediately determined that a library in the vicinity of lecture halls was an absolute necessity. The library's first book was the Polyglot Bible, printed by Christoffel Plantijn, a gift of William of Orange to the library in 1575.  The presentation of this book is regarded as the base on which the library is built (fundamentum locans futurae aliquando bibliothecae). The library became operational in the vault of the current Academy building at Rapenburg on 31 October 1587.

In 1595 the Nomenclator appeared, the first catalogue of Leiden University Libraries as well as the first printed catalogue of an institutional library in the world.  The publication of the catalogue coincided with the opening of the new library on the upper floor of the Faliede Bagijnkerk (now Rapenburg 70) next to the Theatrum Anatomicum.

In 1864 the copy for the complete alphabetical catalogue of the library in Leiden from 1575 to 1860 was finished; it was never to appear in print.  Readers were able to consult alphabetical and systematic registers of the Leiden library in the form of bound catalogue cards, known as Leidse boekjes.  This remained the cataloguing system for the library until 1988.

The 22nd Librarian of Leiden University, Johan Remmes de Groot took the initiative for the Dutch library automation endeavor PICA (Project Integrated Catalogue Automation).  Pica was started up in 1969 and was bought by OCLC in 2000.  The first automation project in Leiden started in 1976, produced 400,000 titles via the Dutch PICA-GGC and resulted within a few years in a catalog on microfiche, which partly replaced the famous Leiden booklets catalogue.

In 1983 the library moved to its present location on Witte Singel in a new building by architect Bart van Kasteel.  The first online catalogue became available in 1988.

According to Nicholas A. Basbanes, Leiden University Libraries represent "an essential benchmark [...] not only for the teeming collection of extraordinary materials it has scrupulously gathered and maintained over a sustained period of time, but most of all for being the world's first scholarly library in a truly modern sense.  The litany of 'firsts' recorded at Leiden is dazzling – the first printed catalogue to be prepared by an institution of its holdings, the first attempt to identify and maintain what today are known as 'special collections,' the first systematic attempt to develop a corps of influential friends, patrons, and benefactors throughout the world, the first 'universal' library, the list goes on and on – and underpinning it all is a humanistic approach to education and discovery that has figured prominently throughout its history, along with an unbending belief in the limitless potential of human inquiry."

Leiden University Libraries today

Leiden University Libraries focuses on the complete information chain. The library facilitates not only access to (published) information but increasingly supports the evaluation, use, production and dissemination of scholarly information. To accomplish this the library's activities range from supporting education in information literacy to serving as an expert center for digital publishing. The library aims to function as the scholarly information manager of Leiden University. The strategic plan Partner in Kennis (Partner in Knowledge)  focuses on the transformation of the library to an expert centre supporting research and education in digital spaces through Virtual Research Environments and Datalabs, the realization of library learning centres, the development of new expert areas such as data curation and text & data mining, and on digital information skills.

Leiden's Catalogue makes available a considerable array of digital scholarly information: more than 400 databases, >70,000 e-journals, >5,000 newspapers and newsmagazines, >1,000,000 e-books and reference works, many hundreds of millions of journal articles, its digital special collections and repository materials. These digital information resources are available worldwide to Leiden University students and staff. 
 
The special collections and archives of Leiden University (see below) are increasingly made available through the library's Catalogue and Digital Collections environment.

The library supports researchers from Leiden University through its Centre for Digital Scholarship which focuses on open access, copyright, data management, text and data mining and virtual research environments.

The library makes all doctoral dissertations available online through the Catalogue and Leiden University Scholarly Publications that functions according to the open access principles. Furthermore, publications from Leiden researchers are increasingly made available through the same repository. Thanks to the use of international standards, among others the Open Archives Initiative, the repository is visited daily by general and specialized search engines that harvest and index this information.

In 2007, the library started with an ambitious program to renew and renovate its facilities: wireless access became available throughout the library in December 2007, in March 2008 the completely renovated Special Collections Reading Room Dousa was reopened, in June 2008 the fire protection systems installed in the closed stacks and the vaults of the library were taken into use, in December 2008 library patrons were able to make use of the new facilities created in the renovated Information Centre Huygens, and a new exhibition space was opened on 25 March 2010, in the direct vicinity of a completely renovated entrance. In 2012–2013 the study areas (the complete first floor and parts of the second floor) of the University Library were renovated and a media centre was opened.

Since 1 June 2009, the Leiden libraries form one organization: Leiden University Libraries (UBL). Leiden University Libraries has a number of locations: the University Library, the libraries of Social and Behavioral Sciences, Law, Mathematics and Natural Sciences and the East Asian Library. The collections of the former Archeology, Art History and Kern libraries are available at the University Library. On 3 September 2012, a Library Learning Centre was opened on the university's The Hague campus.

Leiden University Libraries took over in 2013 the colonial collections including the entire map collections (colonial and modern) of the Royal Tropical Institute (KIT) and in 2014 the complete collection of the Royal Netherlands Institute of Southeast Asian and Caribbean Studies (KITLV). By bringing these collections together with those of the university libraries, the largest Indonesian and Caribbean collections worldwide were created. Furthermore, Leiden University Libraries took over the KITLV-Jakarta office where extensive paper and digital collections on modern Indonesia are collected and cataloged. To house its world-famous and vast Asian collections a number of new facilities have been created: an open stack area making 5 km of materials directly available and a new remote storage facility housing 38 km of library materials. On 14 September 2017, H.M. Queen Máxima opened The Asian Library, a new floor on top of the University Library.

In 2017, the Academic Historical Museum became part of UBL. The library of The Netherlands Institute for the Near East, specialised in the fields of Assyriology, Egyptology and  Near Eastern Archaeology, became part of UBL in 2018.

Leiden University Libraries works together with other organizations nationally and internationally on innovation projects in this area. The library e.g. participated in the DAREnet  project and in projects financed by the European Union such as DRIVER-II  and OAPEN.

Special Collections

Leiden University Libraries hold a large number of special collections of national and international importance. These include manuscripts, early printed books, maps, atlases, prints, drawings, and photographs. To make these collections visible for a broad audience, the library partnered in 2015 with De Boekenwereld, a richly illustrated magazine in Dutch for lovers of books with information about the early and modern book and graphic art.

Western Manuscripts

The collection Western Manuscripts contains all western manuscripts (including 2,500 medieval manuscripts and fragments and 25,000 modern manuscripts), 300,000 letters, archives and 3,000 annotated prints of the University Library, including the archives of the university.

Western Printed Works
The collection Western Printed Works contains materials printed before 1801 (including 700 incunabula) and rare and precious works from after 1801.  In the course of four centuries the collection has been expanded through bequests, gifts and acquisitions of collections from scholars.  Furthermore, the University Library obtained the deposit right for a copy of each book for which the States of Holland had given the privilege to print.  The collection also includes more than 100,000 printed works from the library of the Maatschappij der Nederlandse Letterkunde which has been deposited on permanent loan since 1876.

Bodel Nijenhuis Collection
The Bodel Nijenhuis Collection contains mainly old maps, atlases, topographical prints and drawings.  Most of the collection was obtained as a bequest from J.T. Bodel Nijenhuis. The lawyer Johannes Tiberius Bodel Nijenhuis (1797–1872), director of the publishing house Luchtmans, for 25 years a member of the Maatschappij der Nederlandse Letterkunde, was a passionate collector of cartographical and topographical material.

The collection contains 60,000 maps (of which 3,000 drawings), 1,500 atlases, 24,000 topographical prints, 1,600 drawings and the archive of Youssouf Kamal's Monumenta Cartographica Africae et Aegypti.

Oriental Collections
From its very onset the study of the Orient was of vital importance to the new university. Theologians studied the Semitic languages to perceive the meaning of the Bible. Political and commercial interests prompted the new-born Dutch Republic to establish relations with its enemies' enemies, among whom the Ottoman Empire, then at the zenith of its power. In the course of its expansionist policy the Dutch Republic secured possession of the Indonesian archipelago and other territories in South East Asia. In Japan, Dutch merchants maintained a trading post to the exclusion of all other European powers.

In the course of four centuries countless manuscripts, printed books and photographs on the Orient and Oriental Studies have found their way to the library of Leiden University. Oriental Studies are still flourishing at Leiden University, and the Oriental Collections are still growing to serve the needs of the national and international scholarly community.

The Oriental Collections of Leiden University Libraries are known as the Legatum Warnerianum (Warner's Legacy), referring to Levinus Warner (1619–1665), envoy to the Sublime Porte at Constantinople, whose collection of 1,000 Middle Eastern manuscripts forms the core of the present-day Oriental Collections. In 1659 following the death of the Ottoman bibliophile-encyclopedist Kâtip Çelebi his library was sold. At the time it was the largest private library in Istanbul, and Warner acquired part of it for the University of Leiden.

The Oriental Collections nowadays contain 30,000 manuscripts and 200,000 printed books on subjects ranging from Archaeology to Zoroastrianism and in languages from Arabic to Zulu.

Bibliotheca Thysiana

The Bibliotheca Thysiana was erected in 1655 to house the book collection of the lawyer Joannes Thysius (1622–1653). Upon his early death, he left a legacy of 20,000 guilders for the building of a public library ("tot publycque dienst der studie") with a custodian's dwelling. Designed by the architect Arent van 's-Gravensande, the building follows the Dutch Classical style and is regarded as one of the jewels of Dutch 17th century architecture. It is distinguished by its balanced proportions and the purity of its Ionic order on top of a high basement.

The Bibliotheca Thysiana is the only surviving 17th century example in the Netherlands of a building that was designed as a library.  It is quite extraordinary that a complete private 17th century library has been preserved and thus offers a good impression of the book collection of a young, learned bibliophile from the period of late Humanism.  The collection contains about 2,500 books and thousands of pamphlets in all scientific fields.

Maatschappij der Nederlandse Letterkunde
Otherwise known as the MNL, the "Maatschappij der Nederlandse Letterkunde" (Dutch Society of Letters)  was founded in Leiden in 1766 to promote the study of Dutch historical linguistic subjects. This society joined the Leiden University Libraries in 1876, and since 1999 forms the basis of the DBNL – the digital online library of the Dutch Language, an initiative for an online open access archive of the greatest works in Dutch literary history. The society had regular meetings in Leiden on literary subjects, but also on scientific subjects. It became fashionable for the elite to become members, and many were also members of the Dutch Society of Science (Hollandsche Maatschappij der Wetenschappen), a similar society for the study of scientific subjects founded in Haarlem in 1752. Both societies still hold contests and award prizes for achievement.

Print Room
Founded in 1822, the Print Room possesses art works from the sixteenth century until the present day.  Whether you are interested in mythological scenes from the Italian Renaissance, daguerreotypes, the largest collection of portraits in the Netherlands, stereophotography or Dutch landscapes by Rembrandt and his pupils, the Print Room has them.  The holdings presently amount to some 12,000 drawings, around 100,000 prints and some 80,000 photographs, with an emphasis on Dutch art.  Amongst the drawings and prints you will find works by famous Dutch artists like Goltzius, Visscher, Rembrandt, Troost, Maris, Toorop, and Veldhoen, but prominent artists from other European Schools, like Hogarth, Callot, Canaletto, and Dürer are also present with specimens up to 1900.  The photography collection spreads from its earliest history to the present day and boasts examples of virtually every Dutch photographer, from anonymous nineteenth-century pioneers through Piet Zwart and Paul Citroen to Ed van der Elsken and Johan van der Keuken, including a lot of attention to present day photographers such as Erwin Olaf and Hendrik Kerstens.

Colonial Collection (KIT)
The collection was started in 1864 with the opening of the Colonial Museum in Haarlem, but parts date back to the predecessor of the museum: the department of 'Trade and Colonies'  founded in 1777 and part of the Hollandsche Maatschappij van Wetenschappen. In 1913 the collection was taken over by the Colonial Institute in Amsterdam founded in 1910.  In 1950, after the Dutch decolonization, the mission of the Colonial Institute changed which was reflected in a name change to Royal Tropical Institute. But also the development of the collection changed quite drastically.  In 2013 the library of the Royal Tropical Institute was closed and the part of the collection that dealt with the former Dutch colonies was housed at Leiden University Libraries.

Collection of the Royal Netherlands Institute of Southeast Asian and Caribbean Studies (KITLV)
The KITLV was founded in 1851 and created the foremost collections on Southeast Asia (especially on Indonesia) and the Caribbean (especially Suriname, Aruba and the Netherlands Antilles). The collection contains about 1 million  – mostly postcolonial – books and special collections, including 150.000 digitized historical photographs, maps, prints and unique archives.

On 1 July 2014, the management of the collection was transferred from the Royal Netherlands Academy of Arts and Sciences to Leiden University Libraries.

Scaliger Institute

The Scaliger Institute, founded in 2000, aims to stimulate and facilitate the use of the special collections in both teaching and research.  For this purpose, the institute offers favourable working conditions and expertise, organizes lectures, symposia, master classes, and special courses, and provides fellowships to junior and senior scholars from the Netherlands and elsewhere who wish to work in Leiden for a longer period. These include the Brill, Elsevier, Lingling Wiyadharma, Van de Sande, Juynboll en Ailion fellowships, which focus on different disciplines or regions.

The Scaliger Chair, affiliated with both the Institute at Leiden University Libraries and the university's Faculty of Humanities, is tasked with "promot[ing] teaching and research relating to the Special Collections held by the University library" through outreach activities directed towards academic and non-academic audiences.

Scaliger professors:
 Wim Gerritsen (2002–2006)
 Harm Beukers (2007–2016)
 Erik Kwakkel (2016–2018)
 Rick Honings (2020–present)

Furthermore, an internationally prominent scholar is frequently appointed as 'Visiting Scaliger Professor' who delivers i.a. the Scaliger Lecture: Anthony Grafton (2009), François Déroche (2010), Peter Frankopan (2017), Ted Underwood (2019).

The institute was named after Josephus Justus Scaliger (1540–1609), Leiden's most renowned scholar during the early years of its existence and a great benefactor of the University Library through the donation, at his death, of his exceptional collection of manuscripts and all his oriental books.

Specific information
 Areas of concentration: archaeology, anthropology, art, astronomy, cartography, classics, education, history, law, literature, medicine, Orientalism, papyrology, philosophy, politics, publishing, religion, science.
 Some individual collections: D. Bierens de Haan, Willem Bilderdijk, T. Bodel Nijenhuis, G.J.P.J Bolland, J. Golius, A.P.H. Hotz, J. Huizinga, Constantijn and Christiaen Huygens, F. Kellendonk, Justus Lipsius, P. Marchand, E.M. Meijers, K.H. Miskotte, J. Oort, V. Perelešin, M. Rijke, J.J. Scaliger, C. Snouck Hourgronje, C.P. Tiele, H.N. van der Tuuk, I. Vossius, L. Warner, N. van Wijk, Jan Wolkers.
 Some institutional collections: Bohn Publishers, Sijthoff Publishers, Bibliothèque Wallonne, NHK (Dutch Reformed Church), Seminarium Remonstrantum, photographs Indonesia, ISIM (Islam), Zaken Overzee (Netherlands Ministry of Overseas Affairs).

Documents inscribed in the UNESCO Memory of the World Register
In the prestigious UNESCO Memory of the World Register documents are inscribed that affirm their world significance and outstanding universal value.
 The Leiden La Galigo manuscript, written in Buginese (25 May 2011). From the NBG collection.
 The Dutch translation of the autobiographical manuscript of the Javanese prince Diponegoro (1755 -1855), national hero and pan-Islamist (18 June 2013). From the KITLV collection.
 The Panji manuscripts with ancient tales revolving around the mythical Javanese prince Panji (30 October 2017).

Librarians of Leiden University
Since the founding of the university in 1575 there have been 25 Librarians of Leiden University:

Library locations

Present locations
University Library, Witte Singel 27, Leiden (Architect: Bart van Kasteel)
Asian Library, Witte Singel 27, Leiden (Architect: Katja Hogenboom studio with FELSCH architecten)
Law Library, Steenschuur 25, Leiden
Social and Behavioral Sciences Library, Wassenaarseweg 52, Leiden
Gorlaeus Library and Mathematics and Natural Sciences Library, Einsteinweg 55 & Niels Bohrweg 1, Leiden
Walaeus Library (LUMC), Albinusdreef 2, Leiden
NINO Library, Witte Singel 25, Leiden
Academic Historical Museum, Rapenburg 73, Leiden
Wijnhaven Library, Campus The Hague, Turfmarkt 99, The Hague
KITLV-Jakarta, Jl. H.R. Rasuna Said Kav S-3, Jakarta, Indonesia

Former locations

1587–1595: Academiegebouw, Rapenburg 73, Leiden.

1595–1983: Faliede Bagijnkerk, Old University Library, now: University Board, Rapenburg 70, Leiden.

Leiden University Libraries in fiction 
 Dutch author Frans Kellendonk (1951–1990) located his novel Letter en Geest.  Een spookverhaal. (1982) in Leiden University Libraries.  The main character in the novel Frits Mandaat replaces a sick colleague in the library.  Kellendonk worked briefly in 1979 as a subject specialist for English literature at Leiden University Libraries.

Membership
Leiden University Libraries participates as a member in:
NVB, the Dutch Association of Information Professionals
UKB, the Dutch consortium of university libraries and the National Library
SAE, Academic Heritage Foundation
FOBID, the Netherlands Library Forum
Centre for the Study of the Book, Bodleian Library
LIBER, Association of European Research Libraries
IFLA, International Federation of Library Associations and Institutions
Knowledge Unlatched (Charter member)
OAPEN, Open Access Publishing in European Networks (Founding member)
IIIF, International Image Interoperability Framework (Founding member)

Exhibitions
Leiden University Libraries organizes about four exhibitions annually using Leiden University's rich special collections.  The exhibition room is located in the entrance area of the University Library (Witte Singel) and is open freely for the public during library opening hours.

In addition, Leiden University Libraries regularly organizes extensive exhibitions in collaboration with museums. In the past period the following exhibitions have been realized:
Kaarten: navigeren en manipuleren. National Museum of Ethnology, Leiden, 21 October 2022 – 29 October 2023.
Books that made History. Rijksmuseum van Oudheden, Leiden, 22 June 2022 – 4 September 2022.
Alexine Tinne, photographer – her world view. Haags Historisch Museum, The Hague, 26 January 2022 – 12 Juni 2022.
Photography Becomes Art. Photo-Secession in Holland 1890–1937. The Hague Museum of Photography, The Hague, 7 September 2019 – 8 December 2019.
Leiden Celebrates! Highlights of an Academic Collection. Rembrandt House Museum, Amsterdam, 17 October 2014 – 26 January 2015.
Straatwerken (drawings by 17th century artist Leonaert Bramer). Westfries Museum, Hoorn, 14 December 2013 – 3 March 2014.
World Treasures! From Cicero to Erwin Olaf. Discover the Special Collections of Leiden University. Stedelijk Museum De Lakenhal, Leiden, 9 March 2013 – 30 June 2013.
Turcksche boucken (Turkish books) from Levinus Warner. A seventeenth century diplomat and book collector in Istanbul. Museum Meermanno, House of the Book, The Hague, 15 December 2012 – 3 March 2013.
Sweet&Salt. Water and the Dutch. Kunsthal, Rotterdam, 14 February 2012 – 10 June 2012.
Erwin Olaf: Relief of Leiden. Stedelijk Museum De Lakenhal and Leiden University Libraries, Leiden, 29 September 2011 – 8 January 2012.
In Atmospheric Light. – Picturalism in Dutch Photography 1890–1925. Rembrandt House Museum, Amsterdam, 1 April 2010 – 20 June 2010.
Photography! A special collection at Leiden University. The Hague Museum of Photography, The Hague, 23 January 2010 – 18 April 2010.
On route to the Golden Age – Hendrick Goltzius & Jacob de Gheyn II. , Venlo, 28 November 2009 – 28 February 2010.
City of Books. Seven Centuries of Reading in Leiden. Stedelijk Museum De Lakenhal, Leiden, 22 February 2008 – 1 June 2008.
 Goed gezien. Tien eeuwen wetenschap in handschrift en druk. Rijksmuseum van Oudheden, Leiden. 30 October 1987 – 17 January 1988.

Furthermore, Leiden University Libraries often serves as lender to exhibitions by major museums in The Netherlands and abroad.

Publications

General (selection) 
  Christiane Berkvens-Stevelinck: Magna commoditas – Leiden University's great asset. 425 years library collections and services. Amsterdam, Leiden University Press, 2012.  [Enlarged and updated edition] Digital version
  Elfriede Hulshoff Pol: 'The first century of the Leiden University Library'. In: Leiden University in the seventeenth century. An exchange of learning. Leiden, Universitaire Pers Leiden, 1975. 
  Quaestiones leidenses. Twelve studies on Leiden University Library and its holdings published on the occasion of the quarter-centenary of the university'''. Ed. by Christiane Berkvens-Stevelinck ... et al. Leiden, Universiteitsbibliotheek, 1975 

 Collections (selection) 

  Maps That Made History. 1000 Years of World History in 100 Old Maps. Martijn Storms (ed.). Tielt: Lannoo, 2022. 
  Kaarten die geschiedenis schreven. 1000 jaar wereldgeschiedenis in 100 oude kaarten. Martijn Storms (ed.). Tielt: Lannoo, 2022. 
  Books That Made History. 25 Books from Leiden That Changed the World. Edited by: Kasper van Ommen and Garrelt Verhoeven. Leiden: Brill, 2022. 
  Boeken die geschiedenis schreven. Redactie: Kasper van Ommen & Garrelt Verhoeven. Amsterdam: Athenaeum, 2022. 
  Kester Freriks & Martijn Storms. Grensverkenningen. Langs oude grenzen in Nederland. Amsterdam: Athenaeum, 2022. 
  Fotografie wordt Kunst. Photo-Secession in Holland 1890–1937. Photography Becomes Art. Photo-Secession in Holland 1890–1937. Concept, image editing and text: Maartje van den Heuvel. Zwolle: WBOOKS in collaboration with Leiden University Libraries, 2019. 
  Voyage of Discovery. Exploring the Collections of the Asian Library at Leiden University. Edited by: Alexander Reeuwijk. Leiden: Leiden University Press, 2017.  Digital version
  Luitgard Mols & Arnoud Vrolijk. Western Arabia in the Leiden Collections. Traces of a Colourful Past. Leiden: Leiden University Press, 2016.  Digital version
  For Study and Delight. Drawings and Prints from Leiden University. Edited by: Jef Schaeps, Elmer Kolfin, Edward Grasman, Nelke Bartelings. Leiden: Leiden University Press, 2016. 
  Leiden viert feest. Hoogtepunten uit een academische collectie. Onder redactie van Jef Schaeps en Jaap van der Ven. Leiden: Leiden University Press, 2014. 
  Arnoud Vrolijk, Jan Schmidt & Karin Scheper. Turcksche boucken. De oosterse verzameling van Levinus Warner, Nederlands diplomaat in zeventiende-eeuws Istanbul. The Oriental collection of Levinus Warner, Dutch diplomat in seventeenth-century Istanbul. Eindhoven: Lecturis, 2012. 
  Corien J.M. Vuurman. Nineteenth-century Persia in the Photographs of Albert Hotz. Images from the Hotz Photograph Collection of Leiden University Library, the Netherlands. Rotterdam en Gronsveld: Barjesteh van Waalwijk van Doorn & Co's Uitgeversmaatschappij, 2011. 
  Maartje van den Heuvel, Janrense Boonstra & Jan van Dijk. In atmospherisch licht. Picturalisme in de Nederlandse fotografie 1890–1925. In Atmospheric Light. Picturalism in Dutch Photography 1890–1925. Zwolle: Waanders, 2010. 
  Maartje van den Heuvel & Wim van Sinderen. Photography! A Special Collection at Leiden University. Leiden: Leiden University & the Hague Museum of Photography, 2010. 
  Fotovoorkeuren. 50 auteurs kiezen een foto uit de collectie van het Leids Prentenkabinet. Onder redactie van Joke Pronk & Tineke de Ruiter. Amsterdam: Voetnoot, 2007. 
  Bronnen van kennis. Wetenschap, kunst en cultuur in de collecties van de Leidse Universiteitsbibliotheek. Onder redactie van Paul Hoftijzer, Kasper van Ommen, Geert Warnar & Jan Just Witkam. Leiden: Primavera Pers, 2006. 
  Oostersche weelde. De Oriënt in westerse kunst en cultuur. Met een keuze uit de verzameling van de Leidse Universiteitsbibliotheek. Onder redactie van Jef Schaeps, Kasper van Ommen & Arnoud Vrolijk. Leiden: Primavera Pers, 2005. 
  Hora est! On dissertations. Leiden, 2005. Digital version
  Jan Oort, astronomer, with contrib. by Jet Katgert-Merkelijn & Jos Damen. Leiden, 2000. Digital version
  Goed gezien. Tien eeuwen wetenschap in handschrift en druk. Eindredactie R. Breugelmans. Leiden 1987. 
  R. Breugelmans: Leiden imprints 1483–1600 in Leiden University Library and Bibliotheca Thysiana. A short-title catalogue''. Nieuwkoop, De Graaf, 1974.

See also
List of libraries in the Netherlands

References

External links 

 
Leiden University Libraries Catalogue
Leiden University Libraries Digital Collections
Leiden University Scholarly Publications (Repository)
Scaliger Institute
Videos from and about Leiden University Libraries

Leiden University
Academic libraries in the Netherlands
Archives in the Netherlands
1587 establishments in Europe
Buildings and structures in Leiden